Cosmos was a Latvian a cappella band that formed in Riga in 2002. The band comprised singers Jānis Šipkēvics, Andris Sējāns (both countertenors), Juris Lisenko (tenor), Jānis Ozols (baritone), Jānis Strazdiņš (bass) and Reinis Sējāns (rhythm).

Cosmos gained national and international recognition after they were chosen to represent Latvia in the 2006 Eurovision Song Contest held in Athens, Greece with the song "I Hear Your Heart". Despite winning the national Eirodziesma 2006 contest, the band finished in joint sixteenth place out of the twenty-four finalists, with thirty points.

Discography
Cosmos (2003)
Pa un par (2005)
Тетради любви (2005)
Ticu un viss (2005)
Turbulence (2008)
Pasaki man un tev (2009)

External links
Official website
Review of Pa un par  at RARB.org

Latvian pop music groups
Professional a cappella groups
Eurovision Song Contest entrants for Latvia
Eurovision Song Contest entrants of 2006
Musical groups established in 2002
Musical groups disestablished in 2010
2002 establishments in Latvia
New Wave winners